Anthony Edward Lowry Britton (9 June 1924 – 22 December 2019) was an English actor. He appeared in a variety of films (including The Day of the Jackal) and television sitcoms (including Don't Wait Up and Robin's Nest

He is the father of presenter Fern Britton, scriptwriter Cherry Britton and actor Jasper Britton.

Life and career
Britton was born in a room above the Trocadero public house in Temple Street, Birmingham, Warwickshire, the son of Doris Marguerite (née Jones) and Edward Leslie Britton. He attended Edgbaston Collegiate School, Birmingham and Thornbury Grammar School, Gloucestershire. During the Second World War he served in the Army and he also worked for an estate agent and in an aircraft factory. He joined an amateur dramatics group in Weston-super-Mare and then turned professional, appearing on stage at the Old Vic and with the Royal Shakespeare Company.

He appeared in numerous British films from the 1950s onwards, including Operation Amsterdam (1959), Sunday Bloody Sunday (1971) and The Day of the Jackal (1973). Britton won the Broadcasting Press Guild Award for Best Actor in 1975 for The Nearly Man.

He was the subject of This Is Your Life in 1977 when he was surprised by Eamonn Andrews outside London's Cafe Royal.

From 1983 to 1990, he starred with Nigel Havers and Dinah Sheridan in the BBC sitcom Don't Wait Up, which became a highlight of his career. His other sitcom appearances included ...And Mother Makes Five, Father, Dear Father and as James Nicholls in Robin's Nest.

In September 2013 Sir Jonathan Miller directed a Gala Performance of William Shakespeare's King Lear at the Old Vic in London. Britton played the Earl of Gloucester.

Britton and his first wife Ruth (née Hawkins) had two children, scriptwriter Cherry Britton and TV presenter Fern Britton. Cherry was married to children's TV presenter Brian Cant. Fern is married to Phil Vickery. Britton's second wife was Danish sculptor and member of the wartime Danish resistance Eva Castle Britton (née Skytte Birkfeldt). They had one son, actor Jasper Britton.

Britton died on 22 December 2019, at the age of 95.

Films
 Waterfront (1950) as Deck-Hand (uncredited)
 Cage of Gold (1950) as Nicky (uncredited)
 Salute the Toff (1952) as Draycott
 The Man who Stroked Cats (1955) as Tom Meredith ( Dir. by Anthony Pelissier with Peggy Anne Clifford) (short)
 Loser Takes All (1956) as Tony
 The Birthday Present (1957) as Simon Scott
 Behind the Mask (1958) as Philip Selwood
 The Heart of a Man (1959) as Tony Carlisle
 Operation Amsterdam (1959) as Major Dillon
 The Rough and the Smooth (1959) as Mike Thompson
 The Last Winter (1960) as Stephen Burton
 Suspect (1960) as Robert Marriott 
 The Break (1963) as Greg Parker
 Dr. Syn Alias the Scarecrow (1963) as Simon Bates
 There's a Girl in My Soup (1970) as Andrew Hunter
 Sunday Bloody Sunday (1971) as George Harding 
 Mr. Forbush and the Penguins (1971) as George Dewport
 The Day of the Jackal (1973) as Superintendent Brian Thomas
 Night Watch (1973) as Tony
 The People That Time Forgot (1977) as Captain Lawton
 Agatha (1979) as William Collins
 Countdown to War (1989) as Sir Nevile Henderson
 Run for Your Wife (2012) as Man on Bus (final film role)

Television
 Melissa (1964)
 The Saint (1968)
 Marked Personal (1974)
The Nearly Man (1975)
...And Mother Makes Five (1975)
Robin's Nest (1977–1981)
Don't Wait Up (1983–1990)
Strangers and Brothers (1984)
Don't Tell Father (1992)
The Royal (2006)

References

External links
 
 Performances listed in Theatre Archive University of Bristol

1924 births
2019 deaths
English male film actors
English male television actors
People from Birmingham, West Midlands
Royal Artillery officers
British Army personnel of World War II